Gumyōji Station could refer to one of two train stations in Japan:

 Gumyōji Station (Yokohama Subway)
 Gumyōji Station (Keikyū)